Francesco Paolo Bontade (1914 – February 25, 1974), also known as Don Paolino Bonta, was a legendary and powerful member of the Sicilian Mafia. Some sources spell his surname Bontate. He hailed from Villagrazia, a rural village before it was absorbed into the city of Palermo in the 1960s. His father Stefano had been a powerful Mafia boss in the area that included Santa Maria di Gesù and Guadagna.

Traditional capomafia
According to the Palermo criminal court, Don Paolino embodied “the traditional capomafia who intervenes directly in all matters in his area, arbitrating private disputes, assuming the role of great protector of his citizens, infiltrating public offices and private companies, exercising his influence through sly and hidden intimidation systems covered up by formally correct and respectful behaviour.”

He was a pallbearer at the funeral of Mafia boss Calogero Vizzini – one of the most influential Mafia bosses of Sicily after World War II until his death in 1954. He stood next to Giuseppe Genco Russo – considered to be the heir of Vizzini – an indication of the Mafia stature of Bontade.

Political connections
Like Vizzini, Bontade first backed the Sicilian separatist movement after the Allied invasion of the island in 1943. When it became clear that an independent Sicily was not feasible, he switched to support the Monarchist Party. In 1958, he backed the regional Sicilian government of Silvio Milazzo, an atypical coalition government that was supported by Communists, Monarchists, Neo-Fascists and dissident Christian Democrats. The government was formed in protest against infringement on Sicilian autonomy and threat to Sicilian patronage by the Christian Democrat party headquarters in Rome. He did not hesitate to publicly slap in the face a deputy that had not voted in favour of Milazzo.

After this interlude, he became a staunch supporter of the Christian Democrats, through his connection with the Salvo cousins – other supporters of Milazzo who, as a result, gained control over the private concession for collecting taxes in Sicily. The Salvos and Bontade withdrew their support for Milazzo when the mainstream Christian Democrats tried to regain control of the region. The relation with the Salvos allowed Don Paolino, and later his son Stefano Bontade, access to influential regional politicians.

According to the pentito, Francesco Marino Mannoia, he was close with Bernardo Mattarella, an important Christian Democrat politician and Minister in various governments in the 1950s and 1960s.

Exercising his power
He used his excellent connections to secure the location Eletronica Siciliana (ELSI), a subsidiary of the huge US defence contractor Raytheon, in his district in 1962. The Italian manager of the factory later testified to the parliament’s Antimafia Commission about why he had to deal with the Mafia boss: “Paolo Bonta is useful to me, he provides me with the water I need, he gives me the land to expand the factory and I depend on him for workers to run the factory.” He had first noted the muscle of Bontade when during a meeting in the factory where all the highest regional and local authorities were present, the door opened and a short, fat man walked in. Everyone immediately turned to the new arrival to embrace him. “At that moment, I understood what the word ‘mafia’ meant,” he later recalled.

Banishment and resignation
In the aftermath of the First Mafia War in 1962-63 and the Ciaculli Massacre that prompted the first concerted Antimafia efforts by the state in post-war Italy, Bontade was among the many that received an internal banishment in Italy to dislodge Mafiosi from their home towns. Around 1964, Don Paolino Bontade, stepped down as head of the Mafia family because of ill health; he suffered from diabetes. His son Stefano Bontade succeeded him as the boss of the Mafia family.

In December 1968, he was absolved in the Trial of the 114. He died on February 25, 1974, after he spent six months as a bedridden patient in a hospital in Messina.

References

 Caruso, Alfio (2000). Da cosa nasce cosa. Storia della mafia del 1943 a oggi, Milan: Longanesi 
Dickie, John (2004). Cosa Nostra. A history of the Sicilian Mafia, London: Coronet, 
Lupo, Salvatore (2009). History of the Mafia, New York: Columbia University Press, 
Paoli, Letizia (2003). Mafia Brotherhoods: Organized Crime, Italian Style, New York: Oxford University Press 
 Seindal, René (1998). Mafia: Money and Politics in Sicily, 1950-1997, Copenhagen: Museum Tusculanum Press 
Stille, Alexander (1995). Excellent Cadavers. The Mafia and the Death of the First Italian Republic, New York: Vintage 

1939 births
1964 deaths
Sicilian mafiosi